The African warblers are a newly erected family Macrosphenidae, of songbirds. Most of the species were formerly placed in the Old World warbler family Sylviidae, although one species, the rockrunner, was placed in the babbler family, Timaliidae. A series of molecular studies of the Old World warblers and other bird families in the superfamily  Sylvioidea (which includes the larks, swallows and tits) found that the African warblers were not part of Sylviidae but were instead an early (basal) offshoot of the entire clade Sylvioidea. Some taxonomic authorities place the entire family Hyliidae here.

Distribution and habitat
The African warblers inhabit a range of habitats in sub-Saharan Africa. These range from primary rainforest to forest edge and open woodland habitats for the longbills, wooded savanna to arid scrubland and bushland in the crombecs, rocky arid scree areas and grassland  for the rockrunner, and grassland for the moustached grass warbler and Cape grassbird. The family is overwhelmingly non-migratory, although the moustached grass warbler and the northern crombec both make some localised movements in West Africa related to the rainy season.

Description
There is considerable difference in appearance between the genera; for example, the two grass warblers and Victorin's warbler possess long graduated tails, whereas the crombecs have tails which barely extend beyond the tail coverts and folded wings.

Behaviour
The African warblers are insect eaters, and take a range of insect prey. The longbills and crombecs feed in the canopy and in bushes, either as singles or pairs and sometimes in small groups, whereas the other species are more terrestrial in their habits. Where two species co-occur, such as the red-faced crombec and the long-billed crombec over parts of their range, niche partitioning occurs, with one species feeding in the canopy and the other species feeding lower down in the bushes and trees. Some species of both crombec and longbill have been reported to join mixed-species feeding flocks.

Breeding is seasonal and usually timed to coincide with the end of the dry season and beginning of the rainy season; in species with large ranges this can lead to considerable variation as to the exact timing. Information is lacking in many species, but for those that have been studied the African warblers are territorial and monogamous. Nest design varies within the family; the crombecs construct deep pocket-shaped nests suspended from a branch; whereas the Victorin's warbler, Cape grassbird and moustached grass warbler construct cup nests weaved from grass.

Status and conservation
The majority of this family are considered to be fairly secure and are listed by the IUCN as least concern. One species, the Pulitzer's longbill, is listed as endangered. This species is endemic to forests found on escarpments in western Angola, a habitat threatened by forest clearance and the spread of slash-and-burn agriculture, and the population is thought to number less than a thousand and is still declining. Another potential concern is Chapin's crombec, which is either a species or a subspecies of the white-browed crombec. The status of this bird is uncertain, as conflict has prevented surveys in its range, but it may be extinct.

Species

 Genus Sylvietta – crombecs
 Green crombec, Sylvietta virens
 Lemon-bellied crombec, Sylvietta denti
 White-browed crombec, Sylvietta leucophrys
 Chapin's crombec, Sylvietta (leucophrys) chapini – possibly extinct (late 20th century?)
 Northern crombec, Sylvietta brachyura
 Philippa's crombec, Sylvietta philippae
 Red-capped crombec, Sylvietta ruficapilla
 Red-faced crombec, Sylvietta whytii
 Somali crombec, Sylvietta isabellina
 Long-billed crombec, Sylvietta rufescens
 Genus Melocichla
 Moustached grass warbler, Melocichla mentalis
 Genus Achaetops
 Rockrunner, Achaetops pycnopygius
 Genus Sphenoeacus
 Cape grassbird, Sphenoeacus afer
 Genus Cryptillas – formerly Bradypterus (now Locustellidae)
 Victorin's warbler, Cryptillas victorini
 Genus Macrosphenus – longbills
 Kemp's longbill, Macrosphenus kempi
 Yellow longbill, Macrosphenus flavicans
 Grey longbill, Macrosphenus concolor
 Pulitzer's longbill, Macrosphenus pulitzeri
 Kretschmer's longbill, Macrosphenus kretschmeri

References

 
Bird families
Birds of Sub-Saharan Africa